WBTN-FM (94.3 FM) is a radio station licensed to Bennington, Vermont. The station is owned by Vermont Public, and is an affiliate of their News and Information network. The station signed on as WHGC in 1979, airing an Adult Contemporary format. In 1990, the format was flipped to Album Rock, and the station's motto was "The Heart of Rock". In 1995, the format was changed to Top 40 as "The Mix", and the call letters were later changed to WBTN-FM in 1997. In 1999, the station was purchased by Vermont Public Radio as part of its effort to build a two-channel network. While  WAMC in Albany, New York has long claimed Bennington as part of its primary coverage area, VPR's purchase of WBTN gave this part of Vermont access to Vermont-based public radio programming for the first time.

References

External links

BTN-FM
NPR member stations
Radio stations established in 1978
1978 establishments in Vermont